Robert Traill of Greyfriars was born at Denino, in 1603. He was son of Colonel James Traill, of Killcleary, Ireland, Gentleman of the Privy Chamber to Henry, Prince of Wales, and grandson of the Laird of Blebo, and Matilda Melvill of Carnbee. He graduated with an M.A. from St Andrews on 21 July 1621. he went over to Paris, and subsequently joined his brother in Orleans. He later studied at the Protestant College of Saumur. He was an English tutor in France to the sister of the Duke of Rohan in 1628. He was afterwards teacher in a school established by a Protestant minister at Montague, in Bus Poitou. He became chaplain to Archibald, Marquess of Argyll (beheaded 1661). In 1630 he returned to Scotland.

He was ordained to Elie 17 July 1639. In 1640, he was ordered to attend Lord Lindsay's regiment at Newcastle for three months. He was chaplain to the Scots army at Marston Moor in 1644. He was elected by the Town Council 7 November 1648.  He became minister at Old Greyfriars on 23 March 1649. In 1650 he attended the Marquess of Montrose on the scaffold. He was a protestor rather than a resolutioner. He preached before Charles II. at his coronation at Scone in 1651. In 1654 he was appointed by Cromwell one of those for certifying the ability and piety of such as were fit to be admitted to the ministry in the Lothian and Border provinces. With several others he was committed to Edinburgh Castle on 23 August 1660, for engaging in a new Remonstrance, where he lay for ten months, when, having fallen sick, he was temporarily permitted to return home. He was next charged with high treason before the Privy Council, when he obliged himself, 11 December 1662, to remove from the kingdom within a month, under pain of death. John Livingstone was tried the same day.

Move to Holland
Owing to tempestuous weather he experienced difficulty in finding a ship in which to sail to Holland, and the Privy Council granted him a month's further grace in which to take his departure. In a petition he states that he "is towards the age of sixty years, if not more, and so cannot weill take such a journey in such a season without evident hazard of his life" (Reg. P. C). He did make it to Holland along with other ministers and was later joined by his son Robert. For some years he carried on a weekly correspondence with his friend Guthrie of Fenwick. Returning to Edinburgh, he died 12 July 1678, and was buried in Greyfriars. A portrait of him is preserved in Smith's Iconographia Scot and Pinkerton's Scottish Gallery.

Family life
He married 23 December 1639, Jean (died Dec. 1680), daughter of Alexander Annand of Auchterallan, Aberdeenshire, and then Margaret Cheyne (who suffered imprisonment, June 1665, for corresponding with her husband in his exile), and had 3 sons and 3 daughters:
William, minister of Borthwick
his second son also called Robert Traill, minister in London, and Bass Rock prisoner
James, Lieutenant of Stirling Castle, baptised 10 March 1650, died 1721
Helen (married Thomas Paterson, minister of Borthwick)
Agnes, born 1646, died 1690 (married Sir James Steuart of Goodtrees, Lord Advocate of Scotland)
Margaret, born 1648, died 1717 (married James Scott of Bristo, writer in Edinburgh)

Bibliography
A Letter from a Father to his Children
Elie Session
Edin. Comic.
Gen. Sess. Guild, and Reg. (Baptisms, and Burials) 
Acts Pari., vii. 
Lamont's and Nicoll's Diaries
Rutherford's and Baillie's Letters, iii.
Peterkin's Rec. 
Wodrow's History, i., ii., and Analecta iv. 
Edin. Chr. Inst., xxiii. 
Chambers's Arm., ii. 
Wilson's Diss. Churches, i. 
Muii. Univ. Glasg.,.
Steven's Scottish Church in Rotterdam
Murray's Life of Rutherford
Lockerby's Life of J. Brown
Lord Guthrie's Chalmers and Trail Ancestry
Bryce's Old Greyfriars

References

17th-century Ministers of the Church of Scotland
Covenanters
1603 births
1678 deaths